Chubra is a village in Sungurlare Municipality, in Burgas Province, in southeastern Bulgaria.

Chubra Peak on Graham Land in Antarctica is named after the village.

References

Villages in Burgas Province